Nowe Pieścirogi  is a village in the administrative district of Gmina Nasielsk, within Nowy Dwór County, Masovian Voivodeship, in east-central Poland.

The village has a population of 940.

References

Villages in Nowy Dwór Mazowiecki County